The 2001 Triple J Hottest 100, announced in January 2002, was the ninth such countdown of the most popular songs of the year, according to listeners of the Australian radio station Triple J. As in previous years, a CD was released, this time featuring 34 songs (although not the top 34 songs as they were ranked).

When the announcers for the final stretch of the countdown—Adam Spencer and Wil Anderson—got to the number-one track, they first played their own parody track "Matt Hayden", named after the Australian cricketer and set to the tune of "Ms. Jackson" by OutKast. "Ms. Jackson" actually reached the Hottest 100 the next year in 2002 when a cover by The Vines took it to number 30.

Full list

38 of the 100 tracks were by Australian artists (marked with a green background). This is with the 28 Days collaboration with Apollo 440 as an Australian artist.

Artists with multiple entries
Three entries
Something for Kate (2, 13, 37)
The Strokes (12, 59, 66)
Eskimo Joe (25, 31, 34)
Muse (73, 80, 89)
Thom Yorke (One with PJ Harvey and two with Radiohead) (23, 36, 74)
Two entries
Alex Lloyd (1, 63)
John Butler Trio (5, 29)
Weezer (7, 20)
The Avalanches (8, 76)
Gorillaz (9, 15)
Garbage (11, 44)
Tool (14, 49)
Ben Folds (17, 67)
George (19, 92)
Jamiroquai (26, 62)
New Order (38, 90)
The Cruel Sea (39, 78)
Groove Armada (48, 75)
You Am I (56, 57)
At the Drive-In (60, 85)
Spiderbait (71, 88)
Radiohead (36, 74)
Regurgitator (27, 41)

Top 10 Albums of 2001
Bold indicates winner of the Hottest 100.

CD release

See also
2001 in music

2001
2001 in Australian music
2001 record charts